Louis Monta Bell  (February 5, 1891 – February 4, 1958) was an American film director, producer, and screenwriter.

Biography

Monta Bell first appeared in theatrical venues with Washington D.C. stock companies and then took up journalism and publishing in New York. While in New York, filmmaker Charlie Chaplin enlisted the 32-year-old Bell to ghost-write his 1922 memoir My Trip Abroad. Bell, along a number of other apprentices including Harry d'Abbadie d'Arrast and Mal St. Clair, became film editors and assistant directors. Here Bell was “exposed to Chaplin’s meticulous style of comedy construction and a complete immersion in all aspects of filmmaking.”
 
In 1924, Paramount manager Walter Wanger engaged a number of “promising young men without significant directing experience”, among them Bell, to direct pictures at their Astoria Studios, Queens, New York. One of Bell’s early achievements as director is The King on Main Street (1925). Bell developed into a major cinematic stylist, directing sophisticated film essays on “contemporary sexual mores.” Bell is notable for directing the 1926 Torrent, Greta Garbo's first American film.

In 1928, with the advent of sound films, Bell was transferred Paramount Pictures’ east coast operations, serving as head of production at the Astoria Studios. There Bell directed a number of high comedies and low melodramas and later moved to producing films,

Like his mentor Charles Chaplin, Bell championed the superiority of silent cinema as an art form and a method of conveying a story.

Bell was married for six years to actress Betty Lawford, cousin of actor Peter Lawford. Monta directed 20 films from 1924 to 1945. In addition, he produced 20 films and wrote 9 screenplays.

He died on February 4, 1958, at the Motion Picture Country House and Hospital, one day before his 67th birthday. He is interred in Section 8 Garden of Legends in the Hollywood Forever Cemetery, Hollywood, California.

Filmography

Producer

Broadway After Dark (1924, director)
The Snob (1924, director and screenwriter)
Lady of the Night (1925, director)
Pretty Ladies (1925, director)
The King on Main Street (1925, director and adaptation)
Lights of Old Broadway (1925, director)
Torrent (1926, uncredited director)
The Boy Friend (1926, director and producer)
Upstage (1926, director)
After Midnight (1927, director and story)
Man, Woman and Sin (1927, director and story)
The Letter (1929, producer)
Gentlemen of the Press (1929, producer)
Applause (1929, producer)
The Bellamy Trial (1929, director and co-screenwriter)
The Battle of Paris (1929, producer)
Behind the Make-Up (1930, producer)
Young Man of Manhattan (1930, director and producer)
The Big Pond (1930, producer)
Laughter (1930, producer)
East Is West (1930, director and co-producer)
Downstairs (1932, director and producer)
The Worst Woman in Paris? (1933, director and screenwriter)
Men in White (1934, producer)
Student Tour (1934, producer)
West Point of the Air (1941, producer)
Aloma of the South Seas (1941, producer)
Birth of the Blues (1941, producer)
China's Little Devils (1945, director)

Short
The Adventurer (1917, Short) - Man (uncredited)
The Pilgrim (1923) - Policeman (uncredited) (final film role)

Footnotes

Sources 
Koszarski, Richard. 1976. Hollywood Directors: 1914-1940. Oxford University Press. Library of Congress Catalog Number: 76-9262.
Koszarski, Richard. 2008. Hollywood on the Hudson: Film and Television in New York from Griffith to Sarnoff. Rutgers University Press.

External links
 
 

Monta Bell at Virtual History

American film editors
American film producers
1891 births
1958 deaths
Burials at Hollywood Forever Cemetery
Film directors from Washington, D.C.